is a 1973 Japanese film directed by Kōichi Saitō. The story is about the search for the basis of Japanese national identity, and the escape of lovers to the wonderfulness of nature.

Awards
50th Kinema Junpo Award
Won: Best Film
Won: Best Director for Kōichi Saitō
Won: Best Actress for Kyôko Enami

28th Mainichi Film Award
Won: Best Film

References

External links
 
Tsugaru Folksong at the University of California, Berkeley Art Museum & Pacific Film Archive

1973 films
Best Film Kinema Junpo Award winners
Films directed by Kōichi Saitō
1970s Japanese films